Rastrimonas is a monotypic genus of parasitic alveolates in the phylum Apicomplexa. It contains the single species Rastrimonas subtilis. It was described in 2002 from the free-living cryptomonad Chilomonas paramaecium and placed in the new genus Cryptophagus. The following year this was renamed Rastrimonas.

References

Apicomplexa genera
Monotypic SAR supergroup genera